Elam was an ancient civilization in what is now southwest Iran.

Elam may also refer to:

 Elam (surname)
Elam, Dallas, a location in Dallas, Texas, United States, also known as Elam Station
 Biblical Elam, various meanings in the Hebrew Bible
 ELAM (Cyprus), a far-right ultranationalist political party in Cyprus
 ELAM (Latin American School of Medicine) Cuba
 Elam School of Fine Arts, University of Auckland
 E-selectin or ELAM (endothelial-leukocyte adhesion molecule)
 East London Arts & Music (also known as ELAM)
 Early Launch Anti-Malware, a security feature introduced in Windows 8

See also
 includes several people with the surname
 Ilam (disambiguation)
 Eelam
 Elan (disambiguation)